Park is an extinct town in Whatcom County, in the U.S. state of Washington.

A post office called Park was established in 1884, and remained in operation until 1925. The community was named after Charles Park, an early settler.

References

Ghost towns in Washington (state)
Whatcom County, Washington